A  is a car or chariot drawn by four horses abreast and favoured for chariot racing in Classical Antiquity and the Roman Empire until the Late Middle Ages. In Latin the word  is almost always used in the plural and usually refers to the team of four horses rather than the chariot they pull.

The four-horse abreast arrangement in a quadriga is distinct from the more common four-in-hand array of two horses in the front and two horses in the back.

Quadrigae were raced in the Ancient Olympic Games and other contests. They are represented in profile pulling the chariot of gods and heroes on Greek vases and in bas-relief. During the festival of the Halieia, the ancient Rhodians would sacrifice a quadriga-chariot by throwing it into the sea. The quadriga was adopted in ancient Roman chariot racing.

Quadrigas were emblems of triumph; Victory or Fame often are depicted as the triumphant woman driving it. In classical mythology, the quadriga is the chariot of the gods; the god of the Sun Helios (often identified with Apollo, the god of light) was depicted driving his quadriga across the heavens, delivering daylight and dispersing the night.

Classical sculpture 

Modern sculptural quadrigas are based on the four bronze Horses of Saint Mark or the "Triumphal Quadriga", a set of equine Roman or Greek sculptures, the only representation of a quadriga to survive from the classical world, and the pattern for all that follow.
Their age is disputed. Originally erected in the Hippodrome of Constantinople, possibly on a triumphal arch, they are now in St Mark's Basilica in Venice. Venetian Crusaders looted these sculptures in the Fourth Crusade (which dates them to at least 1204) and placed them on the terrace of St Mark's Basilica. In 1797, Napoleon carried the quadriga off to Paris but they were returned after Napoleon's fall. Due to the effects of atmospheric pollution, the original quadriga was retired to a museum and replaced with a replica in the 1980s.

Quadrigae also appear on the frieze of the Libyco-Punic Mausoleum of Dougga, which dates to the 2nd century BC.

Variations 
Though quadrigae were usually drawn by horses, occasionally, other animals or mythological creatures were employed in spectacles and in art. Elephants were sometimes used to draw quadrigae in the Roman imperial period, and more frequently elephant quadrigae were depicted on coins and other official images. In art and sculpture, quadrigae ridden in by the gods were appropriate to their characters; Neptune's quadriga was drawn, for example, by hippocampi (mythological sea-horses).

Modern quadrigas 
Some of the most significant full-size free-standing sculptures of quadrigas include, in approximate chronological order:
 1793 – The Berlin Quadriga was designed by Johann Gottfried Schadow in 1793 as the Quadriga of Victory, perhaps as a symbol of peace (represented by the olive wreath carried by Victory). Located atop the Brandenburg Gate in Berlin, Germany, it was seized by Napoleon during his occupation of Berlin in 1806, and taken to Paris. It was returned to Berlin by Field Marshal Gebhard von Blücher in 1814. Her olive wreath was subsequently supplemented with an Iron Cross. The statue suffered severe damage during the Second World War, and the association of the Iron Cross with Prussian militarism convinced the Communist government of East Germany to remove this aspect of the statue after the war. The iron cross was restored after German reunification in 1990.
 c. 1815 – The Carrousel quadriga is situated atop the Arc de Triomphe du Carrousel in Paris, France. The arch itself was built to commemorate the victories of Napoleon, but the quadriga was sculpted by Baron François Joseph Bosio to commemorate the Restoration of the Bourbons. The restoration is represented by an allegorical goddess driving a quadriga, with gilded Victories accompanying it on each side.
 1819–1829 – The quadriga on the General Staff Building on the Palace Square in Saint Petersburg
 1828–1832 – The quadriga on the Alexandrinsky Theater, in Saint Petersburg
 c. 1841 – The Panther Quadriga on the Semperoper in Dresden
 1845–1848 – The quadriga on top of Thorvaldsen Museum in Copenhagen by Herman Wilhelm Bissen and Stephan Ussing
 c. 1850 – The quadriga on the Bolshoi, above the portico of the Bolshoi Theatre, designed by sculptor Peter Clodt von Jürgensburg 
 c. 1852 – The Siegestor (Victory Gate) in Munich is topped by a lion quadriga created by Martin von Wagner.
 1868 – The quadriga on the ducal palace in Braunschweig was destroyed in 1944 during the Second World War. It was reconstructed in 2008 and is considered the largest one in Europe.
 1888 – Quadriga de l'Aurora as part of the Font de la cascada that is in Parc de la Ciutadella, Barcelona. Erected by Josep Fontserè (with possible contributions by the young Antoni Gaudí).
 1893 – Columbus Quadriga atop the Peristyle Building, World's Columbian Exposition, Daniel Chester French, sculpture 
 1895 – The quadriga of Brabant, situated on top from Parc du Cinquantenaire (1880–1905); constructed for the 50 years of Belgian Independence, in Brussels, Belgium, was built by Thomas Vinçotte and Jules Lagae.
 c. 1898 – Atop Soldiers' and Sailors' Arch at Grand Army Plaza in Brooklyn, New York, lady Columbia, an allegorical representation of the United States, rides in a chariot drawn by two horses. Two winged Victory figures, each leading a horse, trumpet Columbia's arrival. The sculptor was Frederick William MacMonnies.
 c. 1900 – Two quadrigas on the Grand Palais in Paris, the work of French sculptor Georges Récipon
 1904 – Victory and Progress, horse-drawn chariots by J. Massey Rhind on the Wayne County Building in Detroit, Michigan, though each of the two chariots is drawn by three instead of the customary four horses.
 1906 – Progress of the State at the Minnesota State Capitol is unique for being entirely covered in gold leaf, and is situated above a building entrance rather than a triumphal arch. It was sculpted by Daniel Chester French and Edward Clark Potter.
 1911–1935 – The Monument to Vittorio Emanuele II (Monument of Victor Emmanuel II, or Altare della Patria (Altar of the Nation), or Il Vittoriano) in Rome, Italy, features two statues of goddess Victoria riding on quadrigas.
 1912 – The Wellington Arch Quadriga is situated atop the Wellington Arch in London, England. It was designed by Adrian Jones. The sculpture shows a small boy (actually the son of Lord Michelham, the man who funded the sculpture) leading the quadriga, with Peace descending upon it from heaven.
 1919–1923 – The former Banco di Bilbao headquarters at no. 16 Calle de Alcalá in Madrid, now part of Banco Bilbao Vizcaya Argentaria, features two quadrigas on a commercial building. The building was designed by Ricardo Bastida, with the sculptor of the chariot Higinio Basterras, and other sculptures by Quentin de la Torre. The charioteers are helmeted men standing on the handrails of the chariots.
 1926 – The Palace of Justice in Rome (seat of the modern Supreme Court of Cassation) features a bronze quadriga by sculptor Ettore Ximenes.
 2002 – The Warsaw's Grand Theatre features a quadriga reflecting the original Antonio Corazzi's 1833 plans for the building, but not commissioned and executed until 2002.

Gallery

See also
Horses of Saint Mark in Venice, remnants of a quadriga of Constantinople taken by Enrico Dandolo.
Biga, the ancient two-horse chariot.
Trigarium (triga)
Troika
Coach (carriage)

References

External links

Quadriga Encyclopaedia Romana. University of Chicago
Quadriga 
 Berlin.de: Brandenburger Tor, Pariser Platz, Quadriga

Chariots
Architectural sculpture
Ancient chariot racing
History of sculpture
Ancient Roman vehicles
Helios